Jesenské may refer to several places in Slovakia.

Jesenské, Levice District
Jesenské, Rimavská Sobota District